The Bulgarian Women's Volleyball Cup is a Bulgarian women's Volleyball Cup competition held every single year and it is organized by the Bulgarian Volleyball Federation (Българска Федерация Волейбол БФБ), it was established in 1954.

Competition history

Winners list

Honours By Club

References

External links
 www.volleyball.bg 

Volleyball in Bulgaria